Southern Railway Passenger Station is railway passenger depot built ca. 1885 in Westminster, South Carolina. It is one of the oldest buildings in the community.

It was listed on the National Register of Historic Places in 1976.

History 

The Atlanta and Charlotte Air Line Railroad, a predecessor of the Southern Railway, was built in the early 1870s and Westminster was built along the railroad tracks. The station is believed to have been built about 1885. It has a deep hip roof. Built of wood, it was covered with asbestos siding in around 1940. It had two waiting rooms, an office, and a baggage room. It ceased being used as a passenger depot in 1969 when passenger service to the city was suspended.

It was converted into community uses such as a meeting room and a community health center. 
In 2006, it suffered damage in a fire. The station was rebuilt.

References 

Railway stations on the National Register of Historic Places in South Carolina
National Register of Historic Places in Oconee County, South Carolina
Railway stations closed in 1969
Railway stations in the United States opened in 1885
Westminster
Former railway stations in South Carolina